Imperceptus is a genus of jumping spiders found in India. Its single described species is Imperceptus minutus.

References

  (2007): The world spider catalog, version 8.0. American Museum of Natural History.

Salticidae
Spiders of the Indian subcontinent
Monotypic Salticidae genera